Carlo Di Palma (17 April 19259 July 2004) was an Italian cinematographer, renowned for his work on both color and black-and-white films, whose most famous collaborations were with Michelangelo Antonioni and Woody Allen.

Early life
Carlo Di Palma was born into a poor Roman family; his mother was a flower seller on the Spanish Steps, while his father was a camera operator for a number of Italian film studios.  In an interview shortly before his death, Di Palma recounted his childhood memories of observing his father in action:  "I'd run to the studio or the location, and watch my father work. I was fascinated by the whole experience. I would stand on a crate sometimes and watch. All of the people that were on the location were pleasant to me. I was very quiet and observant, so with that they let me stay on set. I would watch many different directors over and over."

Career
Di Palma's collaborations with Antonioni included Il deserto rosso (1964); the "Il provino" segment in I tre volti (1965); Blowup (1966); Identification of a Woman (Identificazione di una donna) (1982).  With Woody Allen, he worked on Hannah and Her Sisters (1986), Radio Days (1987), September (1987), Alice (1990), Shadows and Fog (1991), Husbands and Wives (1992), Manhattan Murder Mystery (1993), Bullets over Broadway (1994), Don't Drink the Water (1994), Mighty Aphrodite (1995), Everyone Says I Love You (1996), and Deconstructing Harry (1997).  He also worked with many other noted film directors during his long and productive career. 

He is also a little-known film director.

Carlo Di Palma moved from Italy to the United States in 1983.

He won a Silver Ribbon for best cinematography four times: in 1965 for Il deserto rosso, in 1967 for L'armata Brancaleone, in 1993 for Shadows and Fog, and in 1997 for Mighty Aphrodite, as well as the Outstanding European Achievement in World Cinema award in 2003.

Later years
Di Palma was hired to shoot Allen's film Anything Else (2003), and actually started location scouting before failing an insurance physical, which was required for all key personnel on the crew, resulting in his replacement by Darius Khondji, to Di Palma's great disappointment, as he had been eager to work again after having been on the sidelines for the past six years.

Personal life
In the 1980s, Di Palma married Adriana Chiesa, an exporter of Italian films. She nursed him through his final illness.

References

External links

 
  Carlo Di Palma interview, by Nicholas Pasquariello in April, 1974

1925 births
2004 deaths
European Film Awards winners (people)
American cinematographers
Italian cinematographers
Film people from Rome